Lippard is a surname. Notable people with the surname include:

 George Lippard (1822–1854), American novelist
 Lucy R. Lippard (born 1937), American art critic
 Jim Lippard (born 1965), American skeptic
 Stephen J. Lippard (born 1940), American professor of chemistry and National Medal of Science laureate